Karlodinium armiger is a species of dinoflagellates belonging to the family Kareniaceae. It was first isolated from the Mediterranean sea & described in 2006.

It is a producer of karmitoxin, a toxin structurally related to amphidinols and karlotoxins; however karmitoxin also contains the longest carbon−carbon backbone known for this compound class, and an unusual primary amino group.

It has a spherical shape with a diameter of about 15 µm. Under optimal conditions with supplemented NH4+, it has a division rate of ~0.3 times per day.

References

Gymnodiniales